The Bangalore City Police (BCP) is the law-enforcement agency of the South Indian city of Bangalore. The BCP works under the Karnataka State Police jurisdiction and is headed by the Commissioner of Police, Bangalore City, currently Pratap Reddy, IPS.

The Bangalore City Police consists of foot patrols, mobile patrols, traffic patrols and striking armed force mobile units. The Bangalore City Police jurisdiction is divided into seven zones — East, West, North, South, Central, South-East and North-East. Each zone is further divided into three sub-divisions, each headed by an Assistant Commissioner of Police. Each sub-division consists of several police stations controlled by a Police inspector.

Other units within the BCP include Traffic Police, City Armed Reserve (CAR), City Special Branch (CSB), City Crime Branch (CCB) and City Crime Records Bureau (CCRB).

Bangalore City Police Hoysala Cars 
The Bangalore City Police's mobile patrol consists of mobile vehicular patrols, including Suzuki Ertiga and Toyota Innova cars called Hoysala (named after the empire that ruled over most of Karnataka in medieval India) and bike patrols called cheetah, which consists of TVS Apache and Bajaj Pulsar bikes.

The Bangalore City Police is one of the few police departments in India along with the Pune Police and Kochi Police to use BlackBerry devices.

Ranks of law enforcement in Bangalore
Gazetted Officers
.

Non-gazetted officers

History
Bangalore City Police, established in 1963, was the first established police force in the state of Karnataka. The first BCP Police Commissioner was C Chandi and was of the rank Deputy Inspector General of Police. Today, Bangalore City Police consists of 108 Law & Order police stations, and 42 Traffic Police Stations, including two all-women police stations. It also has more than 200 patrolling vehicles.

Suraksha App
For smartphone users, the BCP has Suraksha App (safety app) available for free. The app helps women in distress alert police for help, as it is linked to the police control room and patrol vehicles in the city.

See also
 Karnataka Police
 Police IT
 Bangalore City Traffic Police

Notes

References

External links

 Bangalore City Police official website 
 News article

Metropolitan law enforcement agencies of India
Karnataka Police
1963 establishments in Mysore State
Government agencies established in 1963